Flavius Valentinianus may refer to any of the following Roman emperors:

 Valentinian I
 Valentinian II
 Valentinian III